Mercedes Jara Moreno (born 27 June 1963) is a Spanish doctor and politician. She is a member of the Congress of Deputies for the Vox party representing the Almeria constituency.

Moreno holds a degree in medicine and surgery from the University of Cádiz. She was appointed as a member of the Congress of Deputies after Vox's original candidate for the Almeria list Carlos Hugo Fernández Roca resigned from the party's parliamentary group.

In the Congress, Moreno has voiced opposition to pregnancy by insemination and instead supports adoption or the "natural act of procreation."

References 

1963 births
Living people
Members of the 14th Congress of Deputies (Spain)
Vox (political party) politicians
Spanish women in politics